The Our Lady of the Rosary Cathedral Also Itabira Cathedral It is a Catholic cathedral located in the municipality of Itabira, in the state of Minas Gerais in the South American country of Brazil. It is also the episcopal seat of the diocese of Itabira-Fabriciano, which also has another seat, the cathedral of St. Sebastian, In the city of Coronel Fabriciano.

History
The parish of Our Lady of the Rosary of Itabira of the Mato Dentro was created on April 6, 1826. The church, known as Matriz do Rosário, was built in the first half of the 19th century. In 1965, with the creation of the Diocese of Itabira, the church of the Rosary obtained the condition of cathedral. On November 9, 1970, after a long period of rain, one of the cathedral's side walls collapsed and one of the towers was badly damaged. The old cathedral was demolished and in the same place the current cathedral was built. Construction began in 1976 and was completed in 1985.

See also
Roman Catholicism in Brazil
Our Lady of the Rosary
Saint Sebastian Cathedral
Saint Sebastian Parish

References

Roman Catholic cathedrals in Minas Gerais
Roman Catholic churches completed in 1985
1826 establishments in Brazil
20th-century Roman Catholic church buildings in Brazil